Wolfgang Pikal is an Austrian football manager.

In his career as a football player, Pikal played for SR Donaufeld. At the age of 22, he suffered a broken ankle and decided to retire as a player.

Since 1999, Pikal trained a number of clubs in Bali. He then studied coaching at several European clubs and now has a 20 certificate coaching, In Bali Pikal handles the Academy of Real Madrid Asia junior team.

References 

Living people
1967 births
Austrian football managers
Austrian expatriate football managers
Expatriate football managers in Indonesia
Austrian expatriate sportspeople in Indonesia